Samar is the third-largest and seventh-most populous island in the Philippines, with a total population of 1,909,537 as of the 2020 census. It is located in the eastern Visayas, which are in the central Philippines. The island is divided into three provinces: Samar (formerly  Western Samar), Northern Samar, and Eastern Samar. These three provinces, along with the provinces on the nearby islands of Leyte and Biliran, are part of the Eastern Visayas region.

About a third of the island of Samar is protected as a natural park, known as the Samar Island Natural Park.

On June 19, 1965, through Republic Act No. 4221, Samar was divided into three provinces: Northern Samar, (Western) Samar and Eastern Samar. The capitals of these provinces are, respectively, Catarman, Catbalogan, and Borongan. In commemoration of the establishment of these provinces, June 19 is celebrated as an annual holiday and many have the day off from work.

Geography

Samar is the third-largest island in the Philippines by area, after the islands of Luzon and Mindanao.

Samar is the easternmost island in the Visayas. And it lies to the southeast of the Bicol Peninsula on Luzon, separated from it only by the San Bernardino Strait.

To the south is Leyte Gulf, which in October 1944 became the site of one of the most consequential naval battles of World War II. And to the north and east of Samar lies the Philippine Sea, part of the Pacific Ocean.

History

Spanish contact 
Samar was the first island of the Philippines sighted by the Spanish expedition led by Ferdinand Magellan. He sighted it on 16 March 1521, having sailed there from the Mariana Islands. Realizing he had arrived at an archipelago, he charted the islands, and called them San Lazaro (Saint Lazarus in English) because they were sighted on Lazarus Saturday. The Spaniards later called the island Filipinas, while the Portuguese called it Lequios. Although Samar was the first island of the Philippines sighted by Magellan, he did not land there. He continued south, weighed anchor at Suluan Island, and then finally, on 17 March 1521, he landed on Homonhon Island.

Years later, other Spanish expeditions arrived. The historian William Henry Scott wrote that a "Samar datu by the name of Iberein was rowed out to a Spanish vessel anchored in his harbor in 1543 by oarsmen collared in gold; while wearing on his own person earrings and chains." Scott recounted a local saga, which the inhabitants called siday, about Bingi of Lawan, a prosperous Lakanate in Samar, and he also recorded that Datu Hadi Iberein came from the Lakanate of Lawan.

Philippine-American War 

The final campaign of the Philippine–American War (1899-1902) took place in Samar and is one of the best known, and most notorious, of the entire war.  A combination of factors resulted in particularly violent clashes.

On September 28, 1901, Eugenio Daza, Area Commander of Southeastern Samar and Valeriano Abanador, the town's police chief, launched an attack on U.S. Army Company C 9th Infantry Regiment who were occupying Balangiga. The Filipino Forces brought one of the only Filipino victories of the war and the worst American defeat in decades.

In 1989, "Balangiga Encounter Day" was established as a provincial holiday in Eastern Samar to celebrate the Balangiga Encounter victory.

The Balangiga Encounter resulted in the brutal March across Samar. "I want no prisoners. I wish you to kill and burn; the more you kill and burn, the better it will please me ... The interior of Samar must be made a howling wilderness ..." — Gen. Jacob H. SmithThousands of Filipinos were slaughtered by American Marines.

In his history of the war, Brian McAllister Linn asserts "Samar cast a pall on the army's achievement and, for generations, has been associated in the public mind as typifying the Philippine War."

World War II 
The waters off the east side of the island also hosted the Battle off Samar on October 25, 1944, wherein a small, unarmored force of United States Navy escorts fought off the center force of the Imperial Japanese Navy, including the Japanese battleship Yamato. During World War II the island was part of a large US Navy base Leyte-Samar Naval Base.

Demographics

References

External links
 
 

 
Islands of Samar (province)
Islands of Northern Samar
Islands of Eastern Samar